Qush may refer to:
 Qush, West Azerbaijan
 Qush-e Alijan
 Qush-e Azim
 Qush-e Chaker
 Qush-e Khazai
 Qush-e Kohneh
 Qush-e Sarbuzi
 Qush, alternate name of Gush Laghar

See also
 Kush (disambiguation)
 Qush Khaneh
 Qush Tappeh (disambiguation)